New Summerfield High School is a 2A public high school located in New Summerfield, Texas (USA). It is part of the New Summerfield Independent School District located in northeast Cherokee County. In 2011, the school was rated "Academically Acceptable" by the Texas Education Agency.

School History
In 1920, because New Summerfield had become a "boom town," the community established a new four-room brick school building at the present-day location of the school. This school served approximately fifty students. As the town slowly grows, the school does also. In the beginning of January 2000, the high school students moved into their new building, which is located just south of the other campus buildings. The Class of 2000 bought an inlay for the middle of the commons area in the new high school building.

Athletics
The New Summerfield Hornets compete in the following sports:

Baseball
Basketball
Cross Country
Soccer
Softball
Tennis
Track and Field

In 2012, a sports complex was started that will include a track, cross country course, soccer field, 2 tennis courts, baseball field, and softball field.  In 2012 they almost made it to state in basketball but lost against San Augustine.

References

External links
 New Summerfield ISD

Schools in Cherokee County, Texas
Public high schools in Texas
Public middle schools in Texas
Public elementary schools in Texas